9 Algorithms that Changed the Future is a 2012 book by John MacCormick on algorithms. The book seeks to explain commonly encountered computer algorithms to a layman audience.

Summary
The chapters in the book each cover an algorithm.
Search engine indexing
PageRank
Public-key cryptography
Forward error correction
Pattern recognition
Data compression
Database
Digital signature

Response
One reviewer said the book is written in a clear and simple style.

A reviewer for New York Journal of Books suggested that this book would be a good complement to an introductory college-level computer science course.

Another reviewer called the book "a valuable addition to the popular computing literature".

2020 edition
The book has been re-released by Princeton University Press in 2020.

References

External links
short video of the author talking about the book

2012 non-fiction books
Computer books
Princeton University Press books